Nate Hybl (born June 19, 1979) is a former American football quarterback.  He played  college football at the University of Oklahoma and was the starting quarterback for the Oklahoma Sooners in 2001 and 2002.  He subsequently played professionally in the National Football League (NFL) with the Cleveland Browns and the Jacksonville Jaguars, mostly working on their practice squads. During his time with the Browns, he was allocated for development in NFL Europe.  Hybl is the founder of gusto! in Atlanta.

High school years
Hybl attended Jeff Davis High School in Hazlehurst, Georgia and was a standout in football and golf.

College career
Hybl began his college career at Georgia and red-shirted as a freshman in 1998. After the 1998 season he transferred to Oklahoma, and sat out for the 1999 season. Hybl started for the Oklahoma Sooners in 2001 and 2002. During his career he won a Big 12 Conference championship and was 2–0 in bowl games as a starter.  He was the MVP of the 2003 Rose Bowl.

References

1979 births
Living people
American football quarterbacks
Cleveland Browns players
Jacksonville Jaguars players
Oklahoma Sooners football players
Scottish Claymores players
People from Hazlehurst, Georgia
Players of American football from Georgia (U.S. state)